Thelymitra latiloba, commonly called the wandoo sun orchid or wandoo shirt orchid, is a species of orchid in the family Orchidaceae and endemic to the south-west of Western Australia. It has a single erect, fleshy, channelled, dark green leaf and up to twelve blue flowers with darker blue veins and sometimes flushed with mauve. The lobe on top of the anther is wavy.

Description
The lobe on the top of the anther is dark purplish black with a wavy white or pink tip. The side lobes have mop-like tufts of purple or white hairs. The flowers are insect pollinated and open on hot days. Flowering occurs from September to November.

Taxonomy and naming
Thelymitra latiloba was first formally described in 2001 by Jeff Jeanes and the description was published in Muelleria from a specimen collected near Brookton. The specific epithet (latiloba) is derived from the Latin words latus meaning "broad" or "wide" and lobus meaning "a lobe", referring to the broad side lobes on the column.

Distribution and habitat
The wandoo sun orchid often grows in thick layers of leaf litter in wandoo forest and woodland and is found between Wongan Hills and Dumbleyung in the Avon Wheatbelt, Jarrah Forest and Mallee biogeographic regions.

Conservation
Thelymitra latiloba is classified as "not threatened" by the Western Australian Government Department of Parks and Wildlife.

References

External links

latiloba
Endemic orchids of Australia
Orchids of Western Australia
Plants described in 2001